Mimimi Games GmbH (formerly Mimimi Productions) is a German video game developer based in Munich that specializes in creating strategy and tactical games. It was founded in January 2011 by Dominik Abé and Johannes Roth, who had previously developed Grounded (2009) while studying video game design. Notable games developed by the studio include The Last Tinker: City of Colors (2014), Shadow Tactics: Blades of the Shogun (2016), and Desperados III (2020). As of November 2021, Mimimi Games employs 38 people.

History 
In October 2008, they began working together under the name "Mimimi" and developed their first game, Grounded, which was released in November 2009. The game got second place in the "Gamesload Newcommer Awards" at the 2009 German Developer Innovation Prize and was nominated in the "Best Concept from a Student Competition" category for the 2010 Deutscher Computerspielpreis ceremony. Following Groundeds release, the team began working in the Unity game engine to create a game, later titled daWindci, in which the player would control the weather to direct a hot air balloon to a destination. A prototype for personal computers was shown at Gamescom 2010, where it received positive reception. However, its mouse-based input system was perceived as an obstacle and the studio was advised to bring the game to mobile devices instead. They thus turned to developer Reality Twist, which agreed to publish the game and Mimimi hired Florian Smolka and Lucas Reiner as artists to overhaul the game's style. On 13 January 2011, Abé and Roth founded Mimimi Productions GbR, and daWindci was released on 14 April that year. Mimimi Productions was incorporated anew as Mimimi Productions UG in January 2012.

Games developed

References

External links 
 

Apple Design Awards recipients
Companies based in Munich
German companies established in 2011
Video game companies established in 2011
Video game companies of Germany
Video game development companies